Professor William D. Marslen-Wilson FBA, FAE (born 1945) is a neuroscientist.

Marslen-Wilson obtained his PhD from Massachusetts Institute of Technology in 1973. He subsequently worked as an assistant professor at the University of Chicago.

In 1977, he took up a post at the Max Planck Institute for Psycholinguistics. This was followed by stints at the Department of Experimental Psychology Cambridge; as Director of the MPI; as a senior scientist at the Medical Research Council's Applied Psychology Unit, and as Professor of Psychology at Birkbeck College, London.

He returned to the Applied Psychology Unit as director from 1997 to 2010, during which time it changed name, to become the Cognition and Brain Sciences Unit.

From 2014-2016, he sat on the editorial board of the journal Philosophical Transactions of the Royal Society B.

As of June 2017, he is Honorary Professor of Language and Cognition at the University of Cambridge.

References

External links 

 
 

1945 births
Place of birth missing (living people)
Fellows of the British Academy
British neuroscientists
Living people
Fellows of the Academy of Experts
Fellows of the Cognitive Science Society
Fellows of Wolfson College, Cambridge
Max Planck Institute directors